In thermodynamics, Stefan's formula says that the specific surface energy at a given interface is determined by the respective enthalpy difference .

 

where σ is the specific surface energy, NA is the Avogadro constant,   is a steric dimensionless coefficient, and Vm is the molar volume.

References

Thermodynamic equations
Chemical thermodynamics